The 1892 Epsom Derby was a horse race which took place at Epsom Downs on 1 June 1892. It was the 112th running of the Derby and was won by Sir Hugo. The winner was ridden by Fred Allsopp and trained by Tom Wadlow.

Race details
 Prize money to winner: £5500
 Number of runners: 13
 Winner's time: 2m 44s

Full result

* The distances between the horses are shown in lengths or shorter. shd = short-head; hd = head; PU = pulled up.

Winner's details
Further details of the winner, Sir Hugo:

 Foaled: 1889
 Sire: Wisdom; Dam: Manoeuvre (Lord Clifden)
 Owner: 3rd Earl of Bradford
 Breeder: 3rd Earl of Bradford

References

 Race Report - Otago Witness
 Race Report - Auckland Star

Epsom Derby
 1892
1892 in British sport
19th century in Surrey